is a railway station on the Karatsu Line operated by JR Kyushu located in Ogi, Saga Prefecture, Japan.

Lines

Station layout 
The station consists of two side platforms serving two tracks. Platform 2 was once an island platform but the middle trackhas been removed. The station building, of traditional Japanese architecture, houses a waiting room and ticket window. Access to platform 2 is by means of a level crossing.

Management of the station has been outsourced to the JR Kyushu Tetsudou Eigyou Co., a wholly owned subsidiary of JR Kyushu specialising in station services. It staffs the ticket window which is equipped with a POS machine but does not have a Midori no Madoguchi facility.

Adjacent stations

History 
The Karatsu Kogyo Railway had opened a track from Miyoken (now ) which, by 25 December 1899, had reached Azamibaru (now ). On 23 February 1902, the company, now renamed the Karatsu Railway, merged with the Kyushu Railway which undertook the next phase of expansion. The track was extended east, with  opening as the final eastern terminus on 14 December 1903. Ogi opened on the same day as an intermediate station on the track.  When the Kyushu Railway was nationalized on 1 July 1907, Japanese Government Railways (JGR) took over control of the station. On 12 October 1909, the line which served the station was designated the Karatsu Line. With the privatization of Japanese National Railways (JNR), the successor of JGR, on 1 April 1987, control of the station passed to JR Kyushu.

Passenger statistics
In fiscal 2016, the station was used by an average of 1,053 passengers daily (boarding passengers only), and it ranked 157th among the busiest stations of JR Kyushu.

References

External links
Ogi Station (JR Kyushu)

Railway stations in Saga Prefecture
Railway stations in Japan opened in 1903
Stations of Kyushu Railway Company
Karatsu Line